The year 1808 CE in archaeology included many events, some of which are listed below.

Events 
 January 12 – John Rennie's scheme to defend St Mary's Church, Reculver, in the south east of England, founded in 669, from coastal erosion is abandoned in favour of demolition, despite the church being an exemplar of Anglo-Saxon architecture and sculpture.

Excavations

Finds

Publications 

 Nummi aegyptii imperatorii, by Jörgen Zoega.

Births

Deaths 

 December 4 – Karl Ludwig Fernow, German art critic and archaeologist (b. 1763)

References

Archaeology
Archaeology by year
Archaeology
Archaeology